Mala Sasu Havi is an Indian Marathi-language television series which aired on Zee Marathi. It starred Dipti Devi and Asawari Joshi in lead roles. The show premiered from 27 August 2012 by replacing Eka Lagnachi Dusri Goshta.

Cast 
 Dipti Devi as Meera Rushikesh Ratnaparkhi
 Sankarshan Karhade as Rushikesh Vinayak Ratnaparkhi (Rishi)
 Anand Abhyankar / Rajan Bhise as Vinayak Ratnaparkhi (Aaba)
 Asawari Joshi / Savita Prabhune as Gayatri Deshmane / Gayatri Vinayak Ratnaparkhi
 Sachin Deshpande as Prathamesh Vinayak Ratnaparkhi
 Dipti Ketkar as Abhilasha Prathamesh Ratnaparkhi
 Akshay Pendse / Ashish Kulkarni as Vighnesh Vinayak Ratnaparkhi
 Pradnya Jadhav as Kashmira Vighnesh Ratnaparkhi (Cash)
 Avinash Narkar as Meera's father
 Surekha Kudachi as Abhilasha's mother
 Sameer Khandekar as Abhilasha's brother

Awards

Special episode (1 hour) 
 21 October 2012
 16 December 2012
 27 January 2013
 9 February 2013
 16 February 2013
 23-24 February 2013
 24 March 2013
 21 April 2013
 16 June 2013
 15 September 2013
 9-12 October 2013

References

External links 
 
 

Marathi-language television shows
Zee Marathi original programming
2012 Indian television series debuts
2013 Indian television series endings